Kyōwa may refer to:

Places
Kyōwa, Akita, a former town in Akita Prefecture
Kyōwa, Hokkaidō, a town in Hokkaidō
Kyōwa, Ibaraki, a former town in Ibaraki Prefecture
Kyōwa Station, a railway station of Tōkaidō Main Line

Companies
Kyowa Optical Co., Ltd., a Japanese microscope and instrument manufacturer

Others
Kyōwa, a Japanese era name